The Brooklyn Democratic Party, officially the Kings County Democratic County Committee, is the county committee of the Democratic Party in the New York City borough of Brooklyn (Kings County). It is the most local level of party governance in New York. Kings County Democratic County Committee is one of the largest Democratic county organizations in the United States, and the largest that is not its own city.

In New York, county executive committees typically select candidates for local public offices, with the county committees ratifying the selections, including judicial candidates and the Democratic Party's nominee in special elections. County committees are composed of at least two members elected from each election district as well as two members elected from each assembly district within the county (assembly district leaders).

Every two years, Democrats in each assembly district elect two district leaders: one male, one female. In principle, county committee members select the county committee chair, but in New York City the practice is that the district leaders control the choice. The district leaders and chair make up the executive committee of the county committee. There are 21 assembly districts in Brooklyn, so when all seats are filled, the executive committee has 42 members. Each election district is made up of a small number of city blocks. Each election district has 2 to 4 seats in the general membership of the county committee, so when all the seats are filled, there are approximately 3000 members. However, a vast number of these are left unfilled, undermining broad participation in county decision-making.

Structure

The New York Election Law defines the structure of political parties and requires each party to have county committees. County committees are composed of at least two members elected from each election district as well as two members elected from each assembly district within the county (assembly district leaders). Leadership of the party is held by the Chairman of the Executive Committee, voted on by the State Committee members (who collectively form the Executive Committee). Chairmen are known colloquially as "Brooklyn Boss" or "Party Boss."

As of 2005, Brooklyn was home to 929,459 enrolled Democrats. There are approximately 10,000 seats on the County Committee, nearly half of which are typically unfilled. There are forty-two elected State Committee members (who also function as assembly district leaders), a male and female for each assembly district in the county, two of each in more populous districts. The Executive Committee is composed of the State Committee members from Brooklyn along with the elected officers of the County Committee.

Criticism and controversies
A 2005 study by the Grassroots Initiative found that in New York City more than 50% of all county committee seats were vacant and that 98% of committee member elections were uncontested.

Although New York's judicial nominating conventions have been criticized as opaque, brief and dominated by county party leaders, critics claim that in heavily Democratic Brooklyn, party control is extreme. While voters choose delegates to the judicial nominating conventions which pick New York Supreme Court judges, the powerful Democratic machine usually controls the delegates, which critics say gives the party almost virtual control over judge selection.

#RepYourBlock
In 2016 a campaign titled #RepYourBlock was led by New Kings Democrats, in collaboration with other Brooklyn political clubs, local progressive politicians and candidates, and everyday citizens, to help reform-minded Democratic voters run for County Committee.

2016 reform attempt
In September 2016 at the first county committee meeting of the new term, the Kings County Democratic County Committee blocked a vote on a set of ethics and transparency amendments to the governing rules proposed by reform activists. The reform amendments were proposed by Brooklyn reform clubs the New Kings Democrats, Prospect Heights Democrats for Reform, and Southern Brooklyn Democrats with the main objectives of:

 Increasing transparency in Executive Committee decision-making processes like the nomination of judges
 Strengthening party ethics to disallow public officials who have been convicted of public malfeasance from being supported by the party
 Broadening participation by limiting the use of proxy votes and allowing for resolutions to be distributed via email and posting on the party website

The proposed reforms were motioned for a vote as five separate amendments to the party rules by committee members. The amendments were motioned for review by the party's executive committee instead of being afforded an up or down vote by the county committee's members. In response to the absence of a committee vote on the proposed reforms, the auditorium erupted into chants of "Reform Now!" followed by impassioned pleas by county committee members to the borough leadership. The general county committee meeting was ended abruptly and prior to the completion of full agenda.

Kings County Party chairman Frank Seddio, who replaced disgraced late Assemblyman Vito Lopez, promised a review of the progressive reforms by a committee made up of members of his choosing.

History
Democratic politics in Brooklyn have long been fractious, "between regulars and reformers and along ethnic and then racial lines." However, the tension between "regulars" and "reformers" has always been somewhat fluid, as past bosses have acknowledged. "Today's reformer is tomorrow's hack," party boss Meade Esposito is reputed to have said, and later boss Clarence Norman echoed those sentiments, once asserting "When you're on the outside, you're a reformer; when you're on the inside, you're a regular. Let's be for real."

Corruption has been an issue in the party, as four of five party bosses (Steingut, Esposito, Norman, and Lopez) were investigated or indicted on corruption charges (in the case of Steingut, after leaving office). For example, in 2003, Supreme Court Judge Gerald Garson, the treasurer of the Kings County Democratic County Committee, was indicted for bribery.

The party boss in Brooklyn was for most of the 20th century a figure of national influence and power; however, that influence has waned. Former boss Vito Lopez has been described as "one of the last of the city's political kingmakers."

List of chairpersons
Chairmen prior to 1909 are not listed. After 1990 it was no longer permissible for the chair to hold a county or city office, but those holding state offices are still eligible.

See also
 Community boards of Brooklyn
 Government and politics in Brooklyn
 Elections in New York
 Politics of New York City

Notes

Further reading
Howell, Ron Boss of Black Brooklyn: The Life and Times of Bertram L. Baker Fordham University Press Bronx, New York 2018

External links
 
 41st A.D. Democrats Club
Bay Ridge Democrats
 Brooklyn for Barack
 Brooklyn Young Democrats
 Central Brooklyn Independent Democrats
 Independent Neighborhood Democrats
 Lambda Independent Democrats of Brooklyn
 New Kings Democrats
 Shirley Chisholm Democratic Club
 Southern Brooklyn Democrats
 Vanguard Independent Democratic Association

Political parties in New York (state)
Government of New York City
Democratic Party (United States)
New York State Democratic Committee